George J. Gruen (1877–1953) was an American watchmaker who managed the Gruen Watch Co. He was the second son of the founder Dietrich Gruen.

External links
Gruen Watch Story

American watchmakers (people)
1877 births
1911 deaths
People from Ohio
American people of German descent
19th-century American businesspeople